James Cantrell may refer to:

Jim Cantrell, American entrepreneur, mechanical engineer and road racer
Jimmy Cantrell (1882–1960), English footballer